Nicole Murray (born 13 October 1992) is a New Zealand cyclist. She competed at the women's individual pursuit C5 event at the 2020 Summer Paralympics, finishing fourth.

Medal record 
Nicole has won multiple medals at Para Cycling World Championships, including a silver medal at the 2018 UCI Para-cycling Track World Championships, a silver and a bronze at the 2022 UCI Para Cycling Road World Championships, and two golds and a bronze at the 2022 UCI Para Cycling Track World Championships.

Classification and adapted equipment 
Nicole rides in the C5 classification. Her left hand is amputated below the wrist, and she rides with some adaptations on her bikes.

Hometown and other interests 
Nicole is from Ōtorohanga, in the Waikato region of New Zealand. She enjoys outdoor pursuits such as caving and surfing.

References

External links
 

1992 births
Living people
New Zealand female cyclists
Paralympic cyclists of New Zealand
Cyclists at the 2020 Summer Paralympics
21st-century New Zealand women